Ayako Sanada (真田 彩子 Sanada Ayako, née Furukawa Ayako 古河 彩子, born August 13, 1972) is a retired Japanese women's professional shogi player who achieved the rank of 3-dan.

Personal life
Sanada's husband Keiichi is also a professional shogi player.

Promotion history
Sanada's promotion history is as follows.
1991, March 1: 2-kyū
1992, April 1: 1-kyū
1997, May 29: 1-dan
2003, April 9: 2-dan
2020, March 31: Retired
2021, April 1: 3-dan

Note: All ranks are women's professional ranks.

References

External links
 ShogiHub: Sanada, Ayako

Japanese shogi players
Living people
Women's professional shogi players
1972 births
People from Fukushima Prefecture
Professional shogi players from Fukushima Prefecture
Retired women's professional shogi players